Nicola Berwick or Nikki Berwick (born 24 December 1978, Rochford, Essex, England) is a British stunt actress.

Biography
Nikki Berwick is a champion of tang soo do.

Filmography as a stunt double
2012: 47 Ronin
2011: Green Lantern, Blake Lively
2008: Quantum of Solace
2008: Franklyn
2008: Indiana Jones and the Kingdom of the Crystal Skull
2007: The Bourne Supremacy
2007: Blood and Chocolate
2006: Casino Royale, Eva Green
2006: Jane Hall
2006: Basic Instinct 2, Sharon Stone
2005: The Legend of Zorro, Catherine Zeta-Jones
2005: Green Street, Claire Forlani
2004: Alexander (2004 film)
2004: Sky Captain and the World of Tomorrow, Bai Ling
2004: Thunderbirds, Sophia Myles
2004: Harry Potter and the Prisoner of Azkaban (film)
2004: The Life and Death of Peter Sellers
2004: Ella Enchanted (film), Anne Hathaway
2004: Agent Cody Banks 2: Destination London, Hannah Spearritt
2003: The Medallion
2003: Lara Croft Tomb Raider: The Cradle of Life, Angelina Jolie
2002: Die Another Day, Rosamund Pike
2002: Blade II, Leonor Varela
2001: Lara Croft: Tomb Raider, Angelina Jolie
2001: The Mummy Returns, Rachel Weisz & Patricia Velasquez
1997: Mortal Kombat: Annihilation, Sonya Blade

External links
 
 HKCinemagic.com

1978 births
British stunt performers
Living people
WFTV Award winners